Red Bank is a borough in Monmouth County, in the U.S. state of New Jersey. Incorporated in 1908, the community is on the Navesink River, the area's original transportation route to the ocean and other ports. Red Bank is in the New York metropolitan area and is a commuter town of New York City. As of the 2020 United States census, the borough's population was 12,936, an increase of 730 (+6.0%) from the 2010 census count of 12,206, which in turn reflected an increase of 362 (+3.1%) from the 11,844 counted in the 2000 census. Red Bank is the fifth-most-densely populated town in Monmouth County.

Red Bank was formed as a town on March 17, 1870, from parts of Shrewsbury Township. On February 14, 1879, Red Bank became Shrewsbury City, part of Shrewsbury Township; this lasted until May 15, 1879, when Red Bank regained its independence. On March 10, 1908, Red Bank was formed as a borough by an act of the New Jersey Legislature and was set off from Shrewsbury Township. The borough was named for the red soil along the Navesink River.

Downtown Red Bank is notable for its many local and well-known businesses including Garmany, Urban Outfitters, and Tiffany & Co. on and around Broad Street. Many annual events happen throughout the year, including the International Beer, Wine & Food Festival, a long-running sidewalk sale, a farmers' market, an indie film festival, the Red Bank Guinness Oyster Festival, a Halloween parade, and a holiday town lighting.

History
Red Bank has been occupied by indigenous peoples for thousands of years. The area of modern-day Red Bank was the territory of the Algonquian-speaking Lenape Native Americans, also called the Delaware by the English. The Lenape lived in the area between the Navesink River and the Shrewsbury River in an area they called Navarumsunk. The Native Americans traded freely with European settlers from England and the Dutch Republic in the mid-17th century, who purchased land in the area.

Originally part of "Shrewsbury Towne", Red Bank was named in 1736, when Thomas Morford sold Joseph French "a lot of over three acres on the west side of the highway that goes to the red bank". English colonists settled Red Bank beginning in the 17th century and it became a center for shipbuilding. Its population grew rapidly after 1809, when regularly scheduled passenger ships were established to serve the route to Manhattan.

By 1844, Red Bank had become a commercial and manufacturing center, focused on textiles, tanning, furs, and other goods for sale in Manhattan. With the dredging of the Navesink River about 1845, Red Bank became a port from which steamboats transported commuters to work in Manhattan. Red Bank grew in size as a result, and because the Raritan and Delaware Bay Railroad constructed a railway in the town in 1860.

In the 20th century, Red Bank was a strong cultural, economic, and political center in Monmouth County until it was hindered by the economic recession that began in 1987. During this time, its economy, based largely on retail commerce, was in decline, due to a real estate scandal. Local pundits and urban planners referred to the town as "Dead Bank".

Beginning in approximately 1991, under the New Jersey Development and Redevelopment Law, the borough authorized the creation of the Red Bank RiverCenter to manage redevelopment in what was designated as a special improvement district. RiverCenter retains authority over the management and redevelopment of a defined central business district, which includes Broad Street from the post office to Marine Park and from Maple Avenue to one block east of Broad Street. A number of urban redevelopment projects have taken place, including improved signage, distinctive and pedestrian-friendly sidewalks and lighting, a coherent design plan for Main Street and other major thoroughfares, and improving the condition of parking lots with landscaping.

The district as originally proposed was larger, to include the commercial areas west of Maple Avenue, including the antique buildings, The Galleria, and Shrewsbury Avenue. But some property owners in this area opposed paying the special assessment. Plans for the larger district advanced but opposition became more rigorous. The proposed district was amended to exclude opponents, and the district that was adopted stops at Maple Avenue.

Geography
According to the United States Census Bureau, the borough had an area of 2.16 square miles (5.58 km2), including 1.75 square miles (4.52 km2) of land and 0.41 square miles (1.06 km2) of water (18.98%).

Red Bank is on the southern bank of the Navesink River in northern Monmouth County, New Jersey.

Unincorporated communities, localities and place names partially or completely within the borough include Newmans Corner.

Red Bank is bordered by the Monmouth County municipalities of Fair Haven, Little Silver, Middletown Township, Shrewsbury and Tinton Falls.

Climate
Red Bank has a humid subtropical climate (Cfa).

Demographics

2010 census

The Census Bureau's 2006–2010 American Community Survey showed that (in 2010 inflation-adjusted dollars) median household income was $59,118 (with a margin of error of $9,139) and the median family income was $79,922 (+/− $12,117). Males had a median income of $51,053 (+/− $6,351) versus $47,368 (+/− $9,445) for females. The per capita income for the borough was $36,424 (+/− $3,310). About 13.1% of families and 14.7% of the population were below the poverty line, including 26.5% of those under 18 and 9.7% of those 65 or older.

2000 census
As of the 2000 United States census there were 11,844 people, 5,201 households, and 2,501 families residing in the borough. The population density was 6,639.1 people per square mile (2,569.1/km2). There were 5,450 housing units at an average density of 3,055.0 per square mile (1,182.2/km2). The racial makeup of the borough was 68.19% White, 20.05% African American, 0.35% Native American, 2.19% Asian, 0.08% Pacific Islander, 6.73% from other races, and 2.41% from two or more races. Hispanic or Latino of any race were 17.11% of the population.

There were 5,201 households, of which 18.0% had children under age 18 living with them, 32.2% were married couples living together, 11.6% had a female householder with no husband present, and 51.9% were non-families. 42.9% of all households were made up of individuals, and 15.9% had someone living alone who 65 or older. The average household size was 2.20 and the average family size was 2.99.

In the borough the population was spread out, with 17.5% under 18, 8.7% from 18 to 24, 35.2% from 25 to 44, 20.3% from 45 to 64, and 18.3% who were 65 or older. The median age was 38. For every 100 females, there were 91.8 males. For every 100 females 18 and over, there were 88.9 males.

The median income for a household was $47,282, and the median income for a family was $63,333. Males had a median income of $45,922 versus $34,231 for females. The per capita income was $26,265. About 6.3% of families and 12.0% of the population were below the poverty line, including 16.5% of those under 18 and 10.6% of those 65 or older.

Economy

Red Bank has an eclectic mix of businesses, including companies in entertainment, retail, professional, medical and hospitality sectors. Among these are major locations of national and luxury retailers. Store openings have included Tiffany & Co. in November 2007.

Arts and culture

Red Bank is a noted social and commercial destination, filled with boutiques, designer clothing and home stores, parks, and restaurants with special events scheduled throughout the year

Since the 1950s, Red Bank has held the Annual Red Bank Sidewalk Sale. The 58th Annual Sidewalk Sale was held from July 27 to July 29, 2012, and was seen in "The Sidewalk Stash", the November 11, 2012 episode of the reality TV series Comic Book Men.

The town is considered a center of artistic activity, and is home to the Monmouth County Arts Council, as well as several art and photography galleries.

Many venues in Red Bank have live performances, plays, and movie showings, including the Hackensack Meridian Health Theatre (formerly known as the Count Basie Theatre), The Vogel, Basie Center Cinemas, and the Two River Theater.

The Hackensack Meridian Health Theatre has hosted performers such as Kevin Smith, Ariana Grande, Bruce Springsteen, Bon Jovi, The Beach Boys, David Sedaris, Tracy Morgan, Bob Newhart, Foreigner, Andy Williams, Brian Setzer, and B.B. King. On April 30, 2005, the Two River Theater Company opened a large performance space, the Two River Theater, which has hosted performers like Hasan Minhaj. Bruce Springsteen filmed his 2005 VH-1 Storytellers special at the theater. Basie Center Cinemas (formerly known as The Marion Huber Theater), also operated by the Two River Theater Company, is a small black box theater that seats about 100.

Boating, sculling, sailing, and fishing are popular outdoor activities in and near Red Bank; in the winter, ice boats sail on the Navesink when it freezes over, as it did in 2009. The Monmouth Boat Club, Marine Park, and the slips of the Molly Pitcher Inn provide access to the Navesink and, from there, Sandy Hook and the Gateway National Recreation Area, the Jersey Shore and the Atlantic Ocean.

Broad Street is one of the borough's central streets and is known for its lavish Christmas decorations during the holiday season. The street is closed to traffic for a free concert sponsored by Holiday Express, after which the lights are all lit again. Up to 7,000 people attend the shows annually.

Red Bank hosts the Red Bank Jazz & Blues Festival in partnership with the Jersey Shore Jazz & Blues Society. "First Night", a New Year's Eve arts and entertainment festival, is a Red Bank event designed to provide an alternative to alcohol-related events.

Each year from 1960 through 2011, a fireworks display was launched from the Navesink River close to Red Bank on July 3, the eve of Independence Day. "KaBoomFest" was held in Marine Park, where local bands and vendors formed a major gathering. In 2010, it attracted as many as 150,000 spectators at its 51st annual event.

Musical groups from Red Bank include alternative rock band Young Rising Sons.

Sports
In 1998, the Red Bank Armory was converted to an ice rink. It is home to the youth hockey team Red Bank Generals.

The George Sheehan Classic began in 1981 as the Asbury Park 10K Classic and quickly became one of the nation's major road running events. The race moved to Red Bank in 1994 and was renamed in honor of George A. Sheehan, the prominent author, philosopher and area physician. Runner's World magazine named the Classic one of the Top 100 Road Races, and The New York Times named it the Best Memorial Race in New Jersey. The 2012 running, shortened to a 5K race, attracted nearly 1,300 participants.

In January 2018, FC Monmouth announced that Red Bank's Count Basie Park would be the home stadium for the team's inaugural season. The team's owners selected this park due to Red Bank's central location in the county both geographically and in terms of the local economy, along with the fact that the stadium will be easily accessible by public transit (NJ Transit Rail and Bus) and by car.

Government

Local government
Red Bank is governed under the Borough form of New Jersey municipal government, which is used in 218 municipalities (of the 564) statewide, making it New Jersey's most common form of government. The governing body comprises a mayor and a borough council, with all positions elected at-large on a partisan basis in the November general election. Voters elect a mayor to a four-year term of office. The borough council comprises six members elected to serve three-year terms on a staggered basis, with two seats coming up for election each year in a three-year cycle. The Borough form of government used by Red Bank is a "weak mayor / strong council" government in which council members act as the legislative body with the mayor presiding at meetings and voting only in the event of a tie. The mayor can veto ordinances subject to an override by a two-thirds majority vote of the council. The mayor makes committee and liaison assignments for council members, and also makes most appointments with the council's advice and consent.

, the mayor of Red Bank is Pasquale Menna, whose term of office ends on December 31, 2022. Members of the Borough Council are Michael K. Ballard (D, 2023), Kathleen A. Horgan (D, 2022), Angela Mirandi (D, 2022; appointed to serve an unexpired term), Jacqueline Sturdivant (D, 2024), Kate L. Triggiano (D, 2024) and Edward Zipprich (D, 2023).

In February 2022, the Borough Council appointed Mirandi to fill the seat expiring in December 2022 that had been held by Erik K. Yngstrom until he resigned from office the previous month.

Federal, state, and county representation
Red Bank is in the 6th Congressional District and is part of New Jersey's 11th state legislative district.

 

Monmouth County is governed by a Board of County Commissioners comprised of five members who are elected at-large to serve three year terms of office on a staggered basis, with either one or two seats up for election each year as part of the November general election. At an annual reorganization meeting held in the beginning of January, the board selects one of its members to serve as Director and another as Deputy Director. , Monmouth County's Commissioners are
Commissioner Director Thomas A. Arnone (R, Neptune City, term as commissioner and as director ends December 31, 2022),
Commissioner Deputy Director Susan M. Kiley (R, Hazlet Township, term as commissioner ends December 31, 2024; term as deputy commissioner director ends 2022),
Lillian G. Burry (R, Colts Neck Township, 2023),
Nick DiRocco (R, Wall Township, 2022), and
Ross F. Licitra (R, Marlboro Township, 2023).
Constitutional officers elected on a countywide basis are
County clerk Christine Giordano Hanlon (R, 2025; Ocean Township),
Sheriff Shaun Golden (R, 2022; Howell Township) and
Surrogate Rosemarie D. Peters (R, 2026; Middletown Township).

Politics
As of March 2011, there were 6,217 registered voters in Red Bank, of whom 2,118 (34.1%) were registered Democrats, 1,185 (19.1%) were registered Republicans and 2,906 (46.7%) were registered as Unaffiliated. Eight voters were registered as Libertarians or Greens.

In the 2012 presidential election, Democrat Barack Obama received 63.2% of the vote (2,730), ahead of Republican Mitt Romney with 35.2% (1,523), and other candidates with 1.6% (70), among the 4,359 ballots cast by the borough's 6,440 registered voters (36 ballots were spoiled), for a turnout of 67.7%. In the 2008 presidential election, Obama received 63.2% of the vote (3,129), ahead of Republican John McCain with 34.0% (1,682) and other candidates with 0.9% (47), among the 4,948 ballots cast by the borough's 6,669 registered voters, for a turnout of 74.2%. In the 2004 presidential election, Democrat John Kerry received 58.1% of the vote (2,849), outpolling Republican George W. Bush with 40.4% (1,984) and other candidates with 0.6% (42), among the 4,905 ballots cast by the borough's 6,856 registered voters, for a turnout percentage of 71.5.

In the 2013 gubernatorial election, Republican Chris Christie received 56.4% of the vote (1,527), ahead of Democrat Barbara Buono with 41.2% (1,116), and other candidates with 2.4% (65), among the 2,772 ballots cast by the borough's 6,510 registered voters (64 were spoiled), for a turnout of 42.6%. In the 2009 gubernatorial election, Democrat Jon Corzine received 46.0% of the vote (1,460), ahead of Christie with 45.9% (1,457), Independent Chris Daggett with 6.3% (200) and other candidates with 0.8% (24), among the 3,176 ballots cast by the borough's 6,332 registered voters, a 50.2% turnout.

Education
The Red Bank Borough Public Schools serve students in pre-kindergarten through eighth grade. As of the 2018–19 school year, the district, comprised of two schools, had an enrollment of 1,434 students and 110 classroom teachers (on an FTE basis), for a student–teacher ratio of 13.0:1. Schools in the district (with 2018–19 enrollment data from the National Center for Education Statistics) are Red Bank Primary School, with 644 students in pre-kindergarten through fourth grade, and Red Bank Middle School, with 648 students in fourth through eighth grades.

For ninth through twelfth grades, public school students attend Red Bank Regional High School, which also serves students from Little Silver and Shrewsbury Borough, along with students in the district's academy programs from other communities who are eligible to attend on a tuition basis. Students from other Monmouth County municipalities are eligible to attend the high school for its performing arts program, with admission on a competitive basis. The borough has five elected representatives on the nine-member Board of Education. As of the 2018–19 school year, the high school had an enrollment of 1,208 students and 119.6 classroom teachers (on an FTE basis), for a student–teacher ratio of 10.1:1.

Red Bank Charter School is a public school for students in kindergarten through eighth grade that operates under a New Jersey Department of Education charter and accepts students and receives its funding from a portion of property taxes, like a typical public school. It does not charge tuition and operates independently of the public school system, with a separate school board. Students are selected to enroll in the charter school based on an annual lottery, which is open to all Red Bank residents of school age.

Other schools in Red Bank include Red Bank Catholic High School and St. James Elementary School, Catholic schools affiliated with Saint James parish and under the supervision of the Roman Catholic Diocese of Trenton.

Infrastructure

Transportation

Roads and highways

Route 35 runs north-south through the borough while CR 520 passes through briefly in the southeastern area.

Public transportation

NJ Transit train service at Red Bank station is provided on the North Jersey Coast Line, offering express and local service. Diesel service operates from Hoboken Terminal to Bay Head, New Jersey. Electric service operates from Penn Station to Long Branch, New Jersey, where the electrified portion of the line ends. Mid-line stations include Newark Penn Station, Newark Liberty International Airport Station, and Secaucus Junction.

Bus service through Red Bank is provided by Academy Bus (express to New York City) and Veolia Transport, running routes under contract to NJ Transit. Local bus service is provided on the 831, 832, 834 and 838 routes.

Health care
Riverview Medical Center is a 476-bed acute care community hospital founded in 1928 as Red Bank Hospital.

In media

Several tunes composed and/or made famous by Count Basie name-check the town in their title, including "Red Bank Boogie" and "The Kid from Red Bank". Basie was born and grew up in Red Bank, starting his musician's career there. A bronze bust of him was commissioned to mark what would have been his 100th birthday in 2004, and placed in the plaza outside the Red Bank train station.

In his 1942 essay "Memoirs of a Drudge", humorist James Thurber recalls being sent to Red Bank by his newspaper's city editor on a tip that "Violets [are] growing in the snow over in Red Bank". Putting in a telephone call to that town's Chief of Police in advance, Thurber is told by a desk sergeant, "Ain't no violence over here."

Some of the films of Kevin Smith, who lived in Red Bank while working as an up-and-coming director, are partially set there, including Chasing Amy, Dogma, and Jay and Silent Bob Strike Back. Smith's comic book store, Jay and Silent Bob's Secret Stash, the setting of the AMC reality television series Comic Book Men, is also in Red Bank, at 65 Broad Street. Smith and View Askew Productions also host the annual Vulgarthon film marathon in various theaters around Red Bank.

Notable people

People who were born in, residents of, or otherwise closely associated with Red Bank include: ((B) denotes that the person was born there.)

 Mimi Alford (born 1943), woman who served as an intern in the White House press office from 1962 to 1963, during which time she had an affair with President John F. Kennedy described in her 2012 book Once Upon a Secret
 Chester Apy (1932–2021), politician who represented District 5B in the New Jersey General Assembly from 1968 to 1970 and again from 1972 to 1974(B)
 Michael Arnone (born 1932), politician who served in the New Jersey General Assembly from 1989 to 2004, representing New Jersey's 12th legislative district, after serving as Red Bank's mayor in 1979 and 1980
 Daniel V. Asay (1847–1930), iceboat racer
 James Avati (1912–2005), illustrator and paperback cover artist
 Frances Blaisdell (1912–2009), award-winning, pioneering flutist and educator first female soloist with the New York Philharmonic
 Sebastian Bach (born 1968), former lead singer of hard rock band Skid Row
 Count Basie (1904–1984), jazz pianist and bandleader The Neal Hefti tune featured in The Atomic Mr. Basie album, "The Kid from Red Bank," refers to him.
 Virginia Bauer (born 1956), advocate for families of the victims of the September 11 terror attacks who is a commissioner of the Port Authority of New York and New Jersey
 Jennifer Beck (born 1967), politician who represents New Jersey's 12th legislative district in the New Jersey Senate, and served in the New Jersey General Assembly from 2006 to 2008
 Clint Black (born 1962), country music singer-songwriter, record producer, multi-instrumentalist and occasional actor
 Dave Bry (1970–2017), writer, music journalist and editor at Vibe, Spin and XXL
 Pete Capella (born 1977), actor and voice actor best known for his voice role as Silver the Hedgehog in the Sonic the Hedgehog games
 William J. Chiego (born 1943), museum curator who has been director of the McNay Art Museum in San Antonio since 1991
 Edmund S. Crelin Jr. (1923–2004), professor emeritus of anatomy at Yale University
 Sean Dawkins (born 1971), wide receiver who played for the Indianapolis Colts, New Orleans Saints, Seattle Seahawks and Jacksonville Jaguars
 David DeFazio (born 1983), American ice dancer who represents Switzerland in international competition
 Peter Dobson (born 1964), actor who had a cameo as Elvis Presley in Forrest Gump
 Sigmund Eisner (1859–1925), clothing manufacturer and president of the Sigmund Eisner Company
 Sigmund Eisner (1920–2012), scholar of medieval literature who was an expert on Geoffrey Chaucer
 Abram Isaac Elkus (1867–1947), lawyer who served as U.S. ambassador to the Ottoman Empire
 Brian Fallon (born 1980), guitarist, songwriter, singer and bandleader of The Gaslight Anthem
 Harry Flaherty (born 1961), linebacker who played for the Dallas Cowboys(B)
 Timothy Thomas Fortune (1856–1928), orator, civil rights leader, journalist and founder of The New York Age, editor and publisher; his Red Bank home, Maple Hill, is on the National Register of Historic Places
 Josh Heald (born 1977), screenwriter, director, and producer best known for his work on Cobra Kai and Hot Tub Time Machine(B)
 Jake Kalish (born 1991), professional baseball pitcher(B)
 Blair Kamin, Pulitzer Prize-winning architecture critic(B)
 Mike Largey (born 1960), professional basketball player who played power forward for Hapoel Tel Aviv B.C. of the Israeli Basketball Premier League from 1984 to 1987
 Marilyn Levy (1922–2014), photographic chemist and inventor based at Fort Monmouth
 Chris Lieto (born 1972), international triathlete who finished second at the Ironman Hawaii 2009
 Phil Longo (born 1968), football coach who is offensive coordinator and quarterbacks coach for the North Carolina Tar Heels football team(B)
 Pamela Malhotra (born 1952), won India's highest award for women after starting an animal sanctuary
 Tom Malloy (born 1974), film actor, writer and producer(B)
 Danielle Marcano (born 1997), professional soccer forward, who plays in the Turkish Women's Football Super League for Fenerbahçe S.K.(B)
 Leo Massa (1929–2009), cross-country skier who competed in the men's 30 kilometre event at the 1960 Winter Olympics
 Eric McCoo (born 1980), former NFL running back(B)
 Christian Miele (born 1981), politician who has been a member of the Maryland House of Delegates since 2015
 Daniel J. O'Hern (1930–2009), former associate justice of the New Jersey Supreme Court who served as councilman and mayor of Red Bank
 Michael J. Panter (born 1969), former assemblyman who represented New Jersey's 12th legislative district in the New Jersey General Assembly
 Haley Peters (born 1992), professional women's basketball forward with the Atlanta Dream of the Women's National Basketball Association
 Frederik Pohl (1919–2013), science fiction author
 Elise Primavera (born 1955), children's author and illustrator
 Donny Pritzlaff (born 1979), freestyle wrestler who represented the United States in international competition, winning bronze medals at the 2006 World Wrestling Championships and the 2007 FILA Wrestling World Cup
 Bob Rommel (born 1962), politician who has served in the Florida House of Representatives from the 106th district since 2016
 Phoebe Ryan (born 1990), singer and songwriter
 David Sancious (born 1953), early member of the E Street Band
 Natalie Schafer (1900–1991), actress who played Mrs. Thurston Howell III on the TV series Gilligan's Island
 Eddie August Schneider (1911–1940), pilot who set airspeed records
 Michael A. Sheehan (1955–2018), author, government official and military officer(B)
 Garrett Sickels (born 1994), outside linebacker who played for the Los Angeles Rams(B)
 Kevin Smith (born 1970), film director who has shot films in Red Bank(B)
 Abigail Spanberger (born 1979), federal law enforcement agent, former CIA operations officer and U.S. representative from Virginia's 7th congressional district
 Snuffy Stirnweiss (1918–1958), second baseman who played for the New York Yankees
 Edmund Wilson (1895–1972), literary critic(B)
 David Wojnarowicz (1954–1992), painter, photographer, writer, filmmaker, performance artist and AIDS activist
 Alexander Woollcott (1887–1943), writer and critic born at the nearby North American Phalanx utopian community
 Dave Wyndorf (born 1956), songwriter, guitarist, singer and Monster Magnet bandleader
 Christopher Young (born 1958), composer and orchestrator of film and television scores(B)

References

External links

 Borough of Red Bank official website
 Red Bank Borough Public Schools
 Red Bank Green, Hyperlocal news and features
 Red Bank, New Jersey history
 Red Bank RiverCenter
 Community website for Red Bank, New Jersey

 
1908 establishments in New Jersey
Borough form of New Jersey government
Boroughs in Monmouth County, New Jersey
Populated places established in 1908